Claudette is a feminine given name.

Claudette may also refer to:

 "Claudette" (song), a song written by Roy Orbison and released by The Everly Brothers in 1958
 Tropical Storm Claudette, numerous tropical cyclones

People with the surname
 Irere Claudette, Rwandan politician, Minister of State in charge of ICT and Technical Vocational Education and Training since 2020